Paralampona is a genus of Australian white tailed spiders that was first described by Norman I. Platnick in 2000.

Species
 it contains eight species:
Paralampona aurumagua Platnick, 2000 – Australia (Queensland)
Paralampona cobon Platnick, 2000 – Australia (Victoria)
Paralampona domain Platnick, 2000 (type) – Southeastern Australia, Tasmania
Paralampona kiola Platnick, 2000 – Australia (New South Wales, Australian Capital Territory)
Paralampona marangaroo Platnick, 2000 – Australia (Western Australia)
Paralampona renmark Platnick, 2000 – Australia (South Australia, New South Wales)
Paralampona sherlock Platnick, 2000 – Southeastern Australia
Paralampona wogwog Platnick, 2000 – Australia (New South Wales)

See also
 List of Lamponidae species

References

Araneomorphae genera
Lamponidae
Spiders of Australia